Marco Holster (born 4 December 1971 in the Netherlands) is a Dutch retired footballer who is last known to have worked as head coach of VVA Achterberg reserves in his home country in 2017.

Career

Holster started his senior career with BFC (Bussum) in 1991. In 1998, he signed for Ipswich Town in the English Football League First Division, where he made twelve appearances without scoring. After that, he played for Dutch clubs Go Ahead Eagles, Door Ons Vrienden Opgericht, Lienden and VVA Achterberg before retiring in 2013.

References

External links 
 'Als profvoetballer ben je gewoon strontverwend, simpel zat' 
 De Gelderlander Tag 
 De 36 sollicitatiebrieven van Marco Holster 
 Pride of Anglia Profile

1971 births
Living people
Dutch footballers
Dutch expatriate footballers
Association football midfielders
Go Ahead Eagles players
Ipswich Town F.C. players
FC Lienden players
SV Huizen players
AZ Alkmaar players
Heracles Almelo players
Expatriate footballers in England
VV DOVO players